Evelyne Accad (born October 6, 1943) is a Lebanese-born educator and writer living in the United States, France and Lebanon.

Life
Accad is the daughter of a Swiss mother (Suzanne Steudler) and a father of Lebanese and Egyptian descent (Fouad Accad). She was born in Beirut in 1943 and grew up in Lebanon and came to the United States in the early 1960s. She was educated at the Beirut College for Women, Anderson College, Ball State University and  Indiana University Bloomington, receiving a PhD in comparative literature from the latter institution. Accad taught at Beirut University College in 1978 and 1984 and at Northwestern University in 1991. She is Professor Emerita in Francophone, Arabophone, African, Middle East, Women's Studies and Comparative Literature at the University of Illinois at Urbana–Champaign and the Lebanese American University in Beirut.

She published her first novel L'Excisée in 1982; it was translated into English as The Excised in 1989. This novel deals with excision of women in both the physical and metaphorical sense.

Although she has her own unique style, Accad was strongly influenced by the Egyptian-born French writer Andrée Chedid and the Egyptian writer Nawal El Saadawi.

Selected works

Fiction 
 Coquelicot du massacre (1988)
 Blessures des Mots: Journal de Tunisie (1993); English version Wounding Words: A Woman's Journal in Tunisia (1996)

Non-fiction 
 Veil of shame: the role of women in the contemporary fiction of North Africa and the Arab world (1978); received the International Educator's Award
 Sexuality and War: Literary Masks of the Middle East (1990)
 Des femmes, des hommes et la guerre: Fiction et Realite au Proche-Orient (1993); received the France-Lebanon Literary Award
 Voyages en cancer (2000); received the Prix Phenix de Literature; English version The Wounded Breast: Intimate Journeys Through Cancer (2001)

References 

1943 births
Living people
Lebanese emigrants to the United States
American women novelists
20th-century American novelists
Ball State University alumni
Indiana University Bloomington alumni
Academic staff of Lebanese American University
Northwestern University faculty
University of Illinois Urbana-Champaign faculty
20th-century American women writers
Novelists from Illinois
American women non-fiction writers
20th-century American non-fiction writers
American women academics
21st-century American women